Nagekeo Regency is a regency on the island of Flores in East Nusa Tenggara province of Indonesia. It covers an area of 1,416.96 km2 and had a population of 130,120 at the 2010 Census, and 159,732 at the 2020 Census; the official estimate as at mid 2021 was 162,463. Established on 2 January 2007 by separation of the eastern districts from Ngada Regency, the regency has its administrative seat (capital) in the town of Mbay on the north coast of Flores.

Administrative Districts 
The Nagekeo Regency is divided into seven districts (kecamatan), tabulated below with their areas and their populations at the 2010 Census and the 2020 Census, together with the official estimates as at mid 2021. The table also includes the locations of the district administrative centres, the number of administrative villages (rural desa and urban kelurahan) in each district, and its postal codes.

Notes: (a) including the offshore islands of Pulau Pasirita and Pulau Watundoa. (b) including the offshore island of Pulau Kinde.

Salt Plant
August 2011: Due to long dry season at the location, Australian saltmaker Cheetam Saltworks Ltd. is considering opening a plant in Nagekeo Regency with investment $15 million on a 1,500-hectare plot plus $6 million to build a port and would employ 1,600 people.

Tourism
Besides pink beach in Komodo National Park area, Flores's other pink beach is in Rii Taa Island, Nagekeo Regency. The island is one hour by traditional fisherman boat from Maropokot small port. In high tide, the island area only 30 meters square, but in low tide becomes 20 hectares area. Popular for local people, but only a few foreign tourists. No shade at all, good for sunbathing in the morning and afternoon.

References 

Regencies of East Nusa Tenggara
Flores Island (Indonesia)